Ole Mørch (born 15 March 1950) is a Norwegian fencer. He competed in the individual and team épée events at the 1972 and 1976 Summer Olympics.

References

External links
 

1950 births
Living people
Norwegian male épée fencers
Olympic fencers of Norway
Fencers at the 1972 Summer Olympics
Fencers at the 1976 Summer Olympics
Sportspeople from Oslo
20th-century Norwegian people